Itasca Township is one of the thirteen townships of Sherman County, Kansas, United States.  The population was 321 at the 2000 census.

Geography
Located in the center of the county, it borders the following townships:
Voltaire Township — north
Washington Township — east
Iowa Township — southeastern corner
Smoky Township — south
Logan Township — west
It lies south of the county seat of Goodland.  While part of Goodland lies within the township's original boundaries, the city is not part of the township.  There are no communities in the township proper.

The intermittent source of the south fork of Sappa Creek is located in Itasca Township.

Transportation
Interstate 70 and U.S. Route 24 run east–west through Itasca Township, while its western border with Logan Township is occupied by the north–south K-27.  A small airport lies in the northern part of the township.  A railroad line also travels east–west through Itasca Township, just north of the interstate.

Government
As an active township, Itasca Township is governed by a three-member board, composed of the township trustee, the township treasurer, and the township clerk.  The trustee acts as the township executive.

References

External links
County website

Townships in Sherman County, Kansas
Townships in Kansas